Corina Maria Morariu (born January 26, 1978) is an American former professional tennis player.

Morariu (pronounced: mo-RA-R'ju) was born in Detroit, Michigan and is of Romanian descent. She turned professional in 1994. Mainly known as a doubles specialist, she won the women's doubles title at Wimbledon in 1999 with Lindsay Davenport. She also won the mixed-doubles title at the 2001 Australian Open with Ellis Ferreira. She reached the Australian Open women's doubles final with Davenport in 2005. She also reached the world No. 1 ranking in doubles in 2000.

In 2001, Morariu was diagnosed with leukemia and began a program of chemotherapy. During this time, Jennifer Capriati dedicated her 2001 French Open victory to Morariu. After recovering from cancer, along with shoulder surgery, Morariu was largely restricted to doubles play. The WTA then created the Corina Comeback Award, which was presented to Morariu by Capriati.

Morariu retired from the tour in 2007. She is an International Sports Ambassador for The Leukemia and Lymphoma Society, and has released a memoir titled Living Through the Racket: How I Survived Leukemia...and Rediscovered My Self. Following her retirement, she began working as a commentator for Tennis Channel.

Grand Slam finals

Doubles: 3 (1 title, 2 runner-ups)

Mixed doubles: 1 (title)

WTA career finals

Singles: 4 (1–3)

Doubles: 20 (13–7)

ITF Circuit finals

Singles (5–0)

Doubles (9–4)

Doubles performance timeline

Awards
 The Corina Comeback Award (established by the WTA and named after her; she was the first recipient)
 The 2002 WTA Tour Comeback Player of the Year Award

References

Publications

External links
 
 
 

1978 births
Living people
American female tennis players
Australian Open (tennis) champions
Sportspeople from Detroit
Sportspeople from Boca Raton, Florida
American people of Romanian descent
Tennis commentators
Tennis people from Florida
Tennis people from Michigan
Wimbledon champions
French Open junior champions
US Open (tennis) junior champions
Australian Open (tennis) junior champions
Grand Slam (tennis) champions in women's doubles
Grand Slam (tennis) champions in mixed doubles
Grand Slam (tennis) champions in girls' doubles
American memoirists
American women memoirists
21st-century American women
WTA number 1 ranked doubles tennis players